The Flow Skatepark was a world-famous skatepark in Columbus, Ohio, US, established July 6, 2001 by Shannon Turner and Craig Billingsley. It was voted #1 skatepark in the United States by Fuel TV. 

The Flow Skatepark closed April 28, 2013.

Contests 
The Dirty East
The Dirty was one of the largest Bmx Pro/Am Contests in the midwest, founded in 2001.

Hellaween

The King of Rhythm

References 

Sports venues in Columbus, Ohio
Skateparks in the United States